Darbehesht may refer to:
 Darbehesht, Fazl
 Darbehesht, Mazul